The Goa Legislative Assembly is the unicameral legislature of the state of Goa in India. The Assembly meets at the Goa State Legislative Assembly Complex in Porvorim, Bardez. The Eighth Goa Legislative Assembly consists of 40 members. The assembly is in charge of the budget, the Assembly appropriates money for social programs, agricultural development, infrastructure development, etc. It is also responsible for proposing and levying taxes.

History
Following the end of Portuguese rule in 1961, Goa was placed under military administration headed by Lieutenant General Kunhiraman Palat Candeth as Lieutenant-Governor. On 8 June 1962, military rule was replaced by civilian government when the Lieutenant-Governor nominated an informal Consultative Council of 29 nominated members to assist him in the administration of the territory. The first Council met on 24 September 1962 in a meeting open to the public.

The Assembly first convened on 9 January 1964 in the Secretariat building (Adil Shah's Palace). Hence, 9 January is marked as "Legislator's Day" every year in Goa. In 1987, Goa became an Indian state and the number of seats in the Assembly was increased to 40.

The Assembly meets at the Goa State Legislative Assembly Complex in Porvorim, Bardez. The construction of the building began on 22 January 1994, and was completed on 5 March 2000.

Composition

Members of Legislative Assembly

List of speakers

References

External links
 Goa Lok Sabha Election 2019 Results Website
Goa Legislature official site

 
Government of Goa
State legislatures of India
Unicameral legislatures